Hilde Sperling defeated Simonne Mathieu 6–3, 6–4 in the final to win the women's singles tennis title at the 1936 French Championships.

Seeds
The seeded players are listed below. Hilde Sperling is the champion; others show the round in which they were eliminated.

 Hilde Sperling (champion)
 Simonne Mathieu (finalist)
 Margaret Scriven (second round)
 Jadwiga Jędrzejowska (third round)
 Simone Iribarne (quarterfinals)
 Madzy Rollin Couquerque (third round)
 Nelly Adamson (quarterfinals)
 Sylvie Henrotin (quarterfinals)

Draw

Key
 Q = Qualifier
 WC = Wild card
 LL = Lucky loser
 r = Retired

Finals

Earlier rounds

Section 1

Section 2

Section 3

Section 4

References

External links
 

1936 in women's tennis
1936
1936 in French women's sport
1936 in French tennis